Version of the Truth is the third studio album by American country music duo Foster & Lloyd. Despite it charting higher (#40) than their previous album, Faster & Llouder (#44), Its singles were less successful. The first, "Is It Love" peaked at #43 on the Billboard Hot Country Songs chart while the second "Can't Have Nothin'" reached #38, their most successful single since 1988's "Fair Shake". Jeff Hanna, a founding member of The Nitty Gritty Dirt Band makes a guest appearance singing harmony on the title track. Other guest musicians include Bernie Leadon from Eagles and Duane Eddy, among others.

"I Will Love You Anyhow" was a single for Tim Ryan in 1992.

Track listing
All songs written by Radney Foster and Bill Lloyd; "All Said and Done" co-written by Vince Gill.
"Is It Love" - 2:38
"Version of the Truth" - 3:01
"I Wishdaida Run Into You" - 3:59
"Leavin' in Your Eyes" – 2:57
"Side of the Road" - 3:51
"It's a Done Deal" - 3:51
"Lonesome Run" – 5:10
"It's Over" - 2:40
"All Said and Done" - 3:23
"Workin' on Me" - 3:48
"Whoa" - 2:41

Reissue track listing
"Is It Love?" - 2:57
"Can't Have Nothin'" - 3:27
"I Will Love You Anyhow" - 3:08
"Version Of the Truth" - 2:56
"Leavin' In Your Eyes" - 2:58
"Side Of The Road" - 3:53
"It's A Done Deal" - 3:53
"Take A Little Time For Love" - 2:47
"I Wishdaida Run Into You" - 3:59
"It's Over" - 2:40
"All Said And Done" - 3:23
"Whoa" - 2:29

Personnel
As listed in liner notes.

Foster & Lloyd
Radney Foster - lead vocals, background vocals, acoustic guitar, electric guitar, hand claps
Bill Lloyd - harmony vocals, "the occasional lead vocal", acoustic guitar, electric guitar, hand claps

And... Our Band...
Pete Finney - pedal steel guitar
Byron House - bass guitar, banjo on "It's Over"
Bob Mummert - drums

Our Guests...
Sam Bush - fiddle on "Lonesome Road", mandolin on "Leavin' in Your Eyes"
John Cowan - vocal harmony on "Lonesome Run" and "All Said and Done"
Jerry Douglas - lap steel guitar on "It's a Done Deal" and "Lonesome Run"
Vince Gill - electric guitar fills and solo on "It's a Done Deal"
Jeff Hanna - harmony vocals on "Version of the Truth"
Bernie Leadon - electric low-string guitar on "All Said and Done"

The "Whoa" lineup
Felix Cavaliere - B-3 organ
Duane Eddy - electric guitar
R.S. Field - drums
Radney Foster - acoustic guitar
Albert Lee - electric guitar
Bill Lloyd - Six string bass
Garry Tallent - bass guitar
Rusty Young - pedal steel guitar

"Workin' on Me"
Bruce Bouton - pedal steel guitar
Tommy Wells - drums
Glenn Worf - bass guitar

Chart performance

Album

Singles

Sources

1990 albums
Foster & Lloyd albums
albums produced by Josh Leo
RCA Records albums